, better known as , is a Japanese singer, entertainer, and actress who is represented by the talent agency, Fitone. She was born in Tochigi Prefecture, Japan.

Discography

Studio albums

Compilation albums

Singles

As featured artist

DVD

Music videos

Image videos

Filmography

TV series

Anime

Films

Radio series

Advertisements

References

External links

 
Official profile 

Japanese women pop singers
Japanese idols
1988 births
Living people
Actors from Tochigi Prefecture
21st-century Japanese actresses
21st-century Japanese singers
Musicians from Tochigi Prefecture
21st-century Japanese women singers